The New Zealand Association of Radio Transmitters (NZART) is a non-profit organisation of amateur radio enthusiasts in New Zealand. It represents New Zealand amateur radio operators nationally and internationally. NZART is a founding member of the International Amateur Radio Union. It is an association of individual members, however those members are encouraged to form local branches.

Membership of NZART is voluntary; it is estimated that approximately 35% of New Zealand's licensed amateur radio operators belong.  Members are represented by Councillors to the NZART Council, the executive body tasked with the business management of the association.

Governance 
The NZART Council includes twelve executives. Three of these are the NZART President, vice-president, and Immediate Past President. Regional councillors are elected to represent different geographic regions of New Zealand: three from the Northern District, three from the Central District, two from the Midland District, and one from the Southern District. The number of Councillors in each district is roughly representative of the number of licensed amateurs that they are directly accountable to in their respective geographic areas.

The NZART Council works with an appointed NZART Business Manager. The Business Manager is employed by NZART (30 hrs per week), and in 2020 an Office Assistant was employed (20 hrs per week). Both are tasked with the day-to-day business operations of the association, including manning their office, and providing administrative duties to AREC, located in Upper Hutt, near Wellington.

Additional officers reporting directly to NZART Council include the National Director Amateur Radio Emergency Communications, The Engineering Licensing Group (ELG) and the Administration Liaison Officer (ALO), who is charged with liaison with the Radio Spectrum Management Group of the New Zealand Ministry of Business, Innovation and Employment (MBIE).

Relations with the New Zealand Government
The NZART has performed an advocacy function, commenting on policy and planning initiatives proposed by the New Zealand government in the areas of radio licences, spectrum allocations for broadband wireless, and the future of digital communication. The Association also contributed to the creation of EMF exposure standards in their role as member of the NZ RF Standard Committee.

In 2006, the Ministry of Economic Development's Radio Spectrum Management division was assisted by NZART and the local Coastguard Boating Education Service in the creation of an update to the Spectrum Management and Registration Technology (SMART) which allowed people to search online for radio operator information including callsigns. In 2008, it was noted that there were some discrepancies between the SMART system and the callsign book produced by NZART.

Publications and services 
The official journal of the NZART is Break-In, a bi-monthly publication containing articles of interest to the amateur radio community. Also, an annual publication known as the Call Book provides an index of licensed amateurs in New Zealand by call sign, providing addresses for the purpose of contact acknowledgement (QSL), as well as much other information useful to the New Zealand radio enthusiast. Other publications include Ham Shacks, Brass Pounders and Rag Chewers, a history of amateur radio in New Zealand, published in 1997 with assistance from the New Zealand Department of Internal Affairs Historical Branch.

In 1980, NZART collaborated with author Jumbo Godfrey ZL1HV to produce a Basic radio training manual: a study course for the amateur radio operators.

The Association provides some educational services, such as providing demonstrative lectures on electromagnetic wave theory. Another service offered by the Association is to provide trained personnel and radio communications systems to Amateur Radio Emergency Communications, a group which liaises with the New Zealand Police and Civil Defense services in emergency situations.

Break-In 
The official journal of the NZART is Break-In, and is published bimonthly. The publication is a requirement of the NZART Constitution  The term break-in refers to a system in CW whereby the transmitting station can hear the other station's signal during “key up” periods.

A total of six issues a year are produced, with the first January/February distributed within the first week of February, and so on.

The close off dates for articles/advertising are year-on-year:

10 January for January/February issue.
10 March for March/April issue.
20 April for May/June issue. (produced to coincide with the AGM over Queens Birthday Weekend)
10 July for July/August issue.
10 September for September/October issue.
10 November for November/December issue.

Each issue normally contains Technical and General articles of interest to amateur radio operators. Sometimes the articles are of a more general nature with some flavour of radio mixed into the article.

In addition, each issue contains a number of columns from various authors covering activities from AREC, Contests, Digitalmodes, DX, Satellites, SOTA, Youth Report and more.

As the official journal Break-In contains information about the association, important news and announcements, AGM news and Remits plus the Annual Accounts. As a magazine it has a wealth of information with many members having copies going back to the very first issue produced in January 1928.

Call Book 
Call Book is annual publication that provides an index of all licensed amateurs in New Zealand by call sign, providing addresses for the purpose of contact acknowledgement (QSL), as well as much other information useful to the New Zealand radio enthusiast, such as a series of Repeater/Beacon Maps for both VHF and UHF repeaters based around New Zealand. This eighty page stapled publication is included free with membership of NZART, bundled with the November–December issue of Break-In. Although produced as a paper publication, electronic versions have also been produced on CD-ROM, with the last version produced in this format in 2017. The membership decide each year at the AGM on the format to be produced.

Branches 
Branches of NZART are generally radio clubs and related organisations, and are found across the country. The Branches facilitate the representation of individual members at a national level through the NZART National Conference. Most radio clubs are individually incorporated and operate on a day-to-day basis independently of the NZART.The number following the branch name is their NZART branch number.

Numerous branches experienced membership decline (possibly proportionate to a national decline), and have been reduced to a status of "recess" for several years.

History

The New Zealand Association of Radio Transmitters formed on 16 August 1926. In the same year, Gordon Smithson (Z1AF) made the first NZART broadcast. The first publication of Break-in, the NZART journal, was in 1928. In 1929 NZART became a more powerful organisation, joining the International Amateur Radio Union and successfully lobbying the New Zealand Government for a reduction in the compulsory licensing fees.

In 1934 the Association became an incorporated society and in 1982 their membership numbers reached a high of 4,397. The first NZART written submission to the New Zealand government was in 1989 and related to the proposed Radiocommunications Bill. In 1998 the Association established the Radioscience Education Trust. NZART is registered as a charity in 2017.

Presidential Terms 
Forty five radio amateurs have led NZART as president.

See also
 Amateur radio call signs of New Zealand

References

External links
NZART official web site

New Zealand
Organizations established in 1926
Clubs and societies in New Zealand
1926 establishments in New Zealand
Radio in New Zealand
Organisations based in Upper Hutt